Molla Fathollah Kashani was a 15th-century jurisprudent, theologian, and commentator. He is most famous for his commentary on Quran Menhaj Al-Sadeghin. He was a student of Ali Ibn Hassan Zavväri that through him, narrated from Mohaghghe Korki an outstanding scholars of Shah Tahmasp’s court.

Molla Fatholla Kashani died in 1580 A.D. (988 A.H.).

Notable works
 The translation of Quran in Persian 
 Tanbih Al-Ghafelin (The Persian explanation of Nahj Al-Balagha)
 Translation of Ehtejaj Tabarsi also known as Kashf Al-Ehtejäj. The book was written for Shah Tahmasp. An old manuscript is kept in Sheikh Safi's treasury in Ardabil.
 Zobdat Al-Tafsir (Quran commentary in Arabic)
 Manhaj Al-Sadeghin Fi Elzäm Al-Mokhälefin

References
Tahoor Encyclopedia: "Man-haj Al-Sädeghin commentary"

Iranian writers
15th-century Muslim scholars of Islam
Iranian Shia scholars of Islam